Polypedates otilophus (also known as the file-eared tree frog, Borneo eared frog, or bony-headed flying frog) is a species of frog in the family Rhacophoridae. This species has prominent, sharp ridges behind the eye, above the ear, referred to in its names.

Taxonomy
Polypedates pseudotilophus from Sumatra and (probably) Java was included in this species until 2014.

Description
The body is robust and dorsally lemon yellow in color, with many thin, black stripes; also the thighs have many black bars. The tympanum is conspicuous, with a serrated bony crest above it (the "ear"). Fingertips are expanded into large discs; those on the toes are smaller. The fingers have only rudimentary webbing whereas the toes are moderately webbed. The tadpoles are yellowish green above and white below, acquiring the stripes seen in adults well before metamorphosis.

Habitat and conservation
Polypedates otilophus typically occurs in secondary habitats, at the edges of primary forest, and also in villages. They are most easily spotted at suitable breeding ponds where adults perch on vegetation 1–4 m above the ground. It is not considered a threatened species by the IUCN.

References

otilophus
Endemic fauna of Borneo
Amphibians of Brunei
Amphibians of Indonesia
Amphibians of Malaysia
Taxa named by George Albert Boulenger
Amphibians described in 1893
Taxonomy articles created by Polbot
Amphibians of Borneo